= The Summer I Ate the Rich =

2025 novel by Maika and Maritza Moulite

The Summer I Ate the Rich is a novel by sister-duo Maika and Maritza Moulite, originally published on April 22, 2025, by Farrar, Straus and Giroux.

== Inspiration ==
Maika Moulite stated in an interview with Publishers Weekly that the protagonist's hatred of the wealthy elite was influenced by her difficulty with her mother's health insurance. The beeping noise that the protagonist Brielle hears throughout the beginning of the novel is based on the noise of her mother's empty pain pump because her insurance refused to authorize the treatment. She said that she and her sister "channeled that rage" into the novel.

== Reception ==
Kirkus Reviews said that the "authors have a lot of important things to say about generational wealth, racism, capitalism, and class" , but criticized a lack of exploration of Brielle's character and zombie powers. Lois Young of School Library Journal praised the novel's beginning, but said that it is "more of a clumsy revenge thriller than a horror narrative". Publishers Weekly said that "Brielle's fluidly rendered narration and the novel's ambitious premise result in a captivating look at one immigrant family's experience via a fantasy lens", but said that the "pacing and plot structure feel stilted". Sarah Osman, writing for The Arts Fuse said that Brielle's character carries the novel, and the novel "falters" when the perspective switches to Brielle's sisters in Haiti, which she said was confusing. She concluded that the novel was an "exercise in magic realist satire" instead of the horror novel it was advertised as.

Book Riot called it the best young adult book of April 2025.
